Rebeldes (also stylized as RebeldeS) was a Brazilian musical group that emerged from the Brazilian soap opera Rebel Rio, produced by Rede Record in partnership with Mexican Televisa. In the plot, the six main characters—Alice, Carla, Diego, Pedro, Roberta, and Tomás—form a fictitious band, and the six actors who play these characters—Sophia Abrahão, Melanie Fronckowiak, Arthur Aguiar, Micael Borges, Lua Blanco, and Chay Suede, respectively—started to act like a real band.

Rebeldes released their self-titled debut album on 30 September 2011 on EMI Music in partnership with Record Entertainment, and it reached third place in Brazil's official music chart, the CD – TOP 20 Weekly ABPD, for two consecutive weeks, with the initial single disc, Do Jeito Que Eu Sou, reaching seventeenth and twenty-first chart positions on the Hot 100 and Hot Pop, the Billboard Brazil, respectively. On 11 April 2012, the sextet released their first live album and DVD, entitled Rebeldes - Ao vivo, recorded during shows in São Paulo to 7,000 people. In the same month as the telenovela, which last aired in October 2012, the band announced their breakup, closing with a last tour, Rebeldes Para Sempre.

Career

2010–2011: Formation and debut album
Singer Chay Suede participated in the fifth season of the Brazilian reality show Ídolos and, shortly after being eliminated in September 2010, was already being considered as a new cast member of Rebel Rio, due to its popularity with the public. At the end of October, the actors who would comprise the band were announced.

The Brazilian band NX Zero took part in producing the debut Rebeldes album. The opening song, recorded by the six protagonists on 14 March 2011, was composed by Di Ferrero, lead singer of the band, guitarist Gee Rocha, and producer Rick Bonadio. The team participated in writing the rest of the album, which we released on 23 September 2011. "Do Jeito Que Eu Sou" came out as the first single, and was accompanied by an acoustic version, originally included on Rebeldes as a bonus track. On 6 November 2011, on the stage of Programa do Gugu, Rebeldes won their first gold record, for selling 50,000 copies of the record. This was certified by the Brazilian Association of Record Producers (ABPD). The band members said they dreamed of playing to national audiences. The tour, titled Rebeldes Teen Festival, began in Porto Alegre in October 2011, with a show that included the participation of pop singer Manu Gavassi. The album went on to be certified Platinum.

2012: Live record and second album
On 11 March 2012, Rebeldes released their first live CD and DVD, titled Rebeldes – Ao vivo. The album reached 5th position in the Top 10, thus garnering the group their second Gold record for 60,000 copies sold, while the DVD was certified Platinum 80,000 copies sold. On 7 April, the band released the promo single "Nada Pode Nos Parar" to publicize the album and DVD. In June, the song "Depois da Chuva" was released as the third official single from the album Rebeldes, with a live clip taken from the band's first DVD.

In September 2012, Rebeldes issued the first single from their second album, "Liberdade Consciente", a reggaeton tune. This was followed in the same month by another single, "Meu Jeito, Seu Jeito", sung by Lua Blanco. The name of the band's second album was also Meu Jeito, Seu Jeito.

2013: The end
In March 2013, after much controversy and rumors, Arthur Aguiar used his Instagram account to confirm the group's breakup. He promised they would still perform the shows which had already been scheduled.

Past members
 Chay Suede
 Lua Blanco
 Melanie Fronckowiak
 Sophia Abrahão
 Micael Borges
 Arthur Aguiar

Discography

Studio albums
 Rebeldes (2011)
 Meu Jeito, Seu Jeito (2012)

Live albums
 Rebeldes – Ao vivo (2012)

Tours

Awards and nominations

References

External links
 Rebeldes videos on R7

2011 establishments in Brazil
Musical groups disestablished in 2013
Musical groups established in 2011
Musical groups from Rio de Janeiro (city)
Brazilian dance music groups
Brazilian pop music groups
Brazilian vocal groups